Filoxenos Toursidis (born 25 April 2001) is a Greek professional footballer who plays as a midfielder.

Career
Born in Greece, Toursidis made his senior debut with Greek side Apollon Pontou U19 and had the contract with the club until January, 2020. On 1, January 2020, he joined the senior side Apollon Pontou appearing in Super League 2, the second division of professional football in Greece and playing for the club with Number 14 Jersey. He secured 7 appearances and smashed the ball once in the net against PAS Giannina whereby they suffered a massive defeat of 1–6.

Career statistics

References

2001 births
Living people
Greek footballers
Association football midfielders
Super League Greece 2 players
Apollon Pontou FC players